Janice Loeb (December 6, 1913 – February 18, 1996) was an American cinematographer, screenwriter, film director and producer. She was best known for her work in the documentary films In the Street (1948) and The Quiet One (1948). She was nominated for two Academy Awards for the latter, becoming the first woman to be nominated in the category of Best Documentary Feature.

Awards and nominations

See also
 List of female Academy Award winners and nominees for non-gendered categories

References

External links
 

1913 births
1996 deaths
American women cinematographers
American cinematographers
American women screenwriters
American documentary film directors
American documentary film producers
20th-century American women writers
Place of birth missing
20th-century American screenwriters
American women documentary filmmakers